Janet Thompson Milner (11 July 1933, in Elliott, Iowa, United States – 9 July 2014) was an American women's basketball player, who played on the first United States women's national basketball team. Thompson played college basketball at Iowa Wesleyan University and earned a gold medal as part of the 1953 team that won the first FIBA World Championship for Women.

References

1933 births
2014 deaths
American women's basketball players
Iowa Wesleyan University alumni
21st-century American women